Liliana Maria Antonieta Dolores Merlo (September 16, 1925 - October 17, 2002) was an Argentine dancer, choreographer, dance teacher and cultural promoter.

Merlo was born in Buenos Aires, Argentina, and became a pioneer of classical ballet in Abruzzo.  She died in Teramo, Italy, aged 77.

Principle choreographic works

References

1925 births
2002 deaths
Argentine female dancers
Italian female dancers
Argentine choreographers
Italian choreographers
People from Buenos Aires